Richard Neville Parker (1884 - 1958) was an English botanist and forester who worked extensively in India.

Publications
1921 . NW Himalayan Astragali of the subgenus Aegacantha
1924 . Botanical notes on some plants of the Kali valley
1925 . On the supposed occurrence of Salix alba L. in the north-west Himalaya
1928 . Two new bamboos from Burma
1931 . The herbarium of the Forest research institute . No. 73 of the Indian forest bulletin. 10 pp.
1931 . Name changes in important Indian trees
1932 . Casuarina root-nodules
1953 . Alien plants growing without cultivation in the West Somerset Neighborhood

References

External links

English botanists
1884 births
1958 deaths
British people in colonial India